Kenglon (also spelt Kenglön), also known as Kyainglun was a small Shan state in what is today Burma.

History
Kenglon used to be a part of North Hsenwi. It became independent from the state of Hsenwi in 1857. It was a tributary of Burma until 1887, when the Konbaung dynasty fell to the United Kingdom and the Shan states submitted to British rule.

In 1926 Kenglon State was incorporated into Kehsi Mansam.

Rulers
The rulers of the state bore the title Myoza.
1857 - 1873                Maung Pwin (Hkun Pwin)             (d. 1873) 
1873 - 1874                Naw Hkam U 
1874 - 1885                Hkun Tawa 
1885 - 1888                Hkun Tawn                          (b. c.1842 - d. ....)
1888 - c.1926              Hkun Mong                          (b. 1844 - d. 19..)

See also
Hsenwi

References

Shan States
1857 establishments in Asia